Sarmad (also transliterated as Sarmed )(سرمد  Arabic) , is a masculine Persian/Arabic given name, the meaning of the name in Persian/Arabic Eternal or Everlasting. The name is also given to Christian male babies born in the Middle East.

In quran sarmad (eternal) is referred to night and morning . Telling they will always take place of each other.
 Sarmad Alam lone 
Entertainer 
 Sarmad Bhatti, Pakistani cricketer
 Sarmad Abdul Ghafoor, Pakistani record producer
 Sarmad Kashani, Persian mystic, poet and saint
 Sarmad Sultan Khoosat, Pakistani actor
 Sarmad Rasheed, Iraqi footballer
 Sarmed al-Samarrai, Iraqi actor
 Sarmad Zia, Pakistani Research Scholar
.

Sources

Arabic masculine given names